Dentifovea praecultalis is a species of moth in the family Crambidae. It is found on the Canary Islands.

The wingspan is about 16 mm.

References

Moths described in 1896
Odontiini
Moths of Africa